"Instruction" is a song by English DJ and record producer Jax Jones, featuring American singer Demi Lovato and English rapper Stefflon Don. It was written by MNEK, Stefflon Don, Demi Lovato and Jax Jones, with the song's production handled by Jax Jones and Mark Ralph. It was released on 16 June 2017, through Polydor Records. "Instruction" is included on the deluxe edition of Lovato's sixth studio album, Tell Me You Love Me.

Background
On 12 June 2017, Jax Jones first shared a snippet of the song on Twitter, along with the single's release date. Stefflon Don also tweeted a similar snippet a few minutes later, while Demi Lovato tweeted it on 13 June 2017, revealing the featured artists of the song. "This one's about to be fire," she captioned her post. Demi Lovato shared a longer teaser of the song on 14 June 2017, revealing more of the song's lyrics.

Composition
"Instruction" is a dancehall song. The Brazilian website for Billboard wrote that the track begins with "[the] samba school's drums" and is followed by "a beat of reggaeton – the rhythm of the moment".

Critical reception
Mike Wass of Idolator said: "The samba-infused banger, which boasts a verse from UK rapper Stefflon Don, is an instant Song of the Summer contender."

Kat Bein of Billboard stated that "it already promises to stomp summer radio into total submission." She described the song as a "massive tune led by booming drums with a colorful pop attitude, counter-pointed by the unmistakable party of Brazilian Carnival."

Music video
The music video was filmed on 20 July 2017, in Los Angeles, California. The music video for Instruction was directed by Ozzie Pullin, and it was released on 2 August 2017. It shows Demi Lovato, Stefflon Don, Jax Jones and other backgrounds artists/dancers dancing and playing various instruments.

Live performances
On 18 August 2017, Jones joined Demi Lovato on Good Morning America, where they made the first televised performance of the track. On 10 November 2017, Jones, Lovato and Stefflon Don performed the song for the first time together at BBC's Sounds Like Friday Night Show. In June 2018, Jones joined Demi Lovato during the Tell Me You Love Me World Tour to perform 'Instruction' during all UK dates except Birmingham.

Usage in media
The song is featured in tenth episode of the television series The Bold Type. The song was featured in the 2017 dance rhythm game, Just Dance 2018. It was also played during the Miss Universe 2017 swimsuit competition. It is also used in a 2018 Schwarzkopf television advertisement in the United Kingdom.

Track listing

Credits and personnel
Credits adapted from Tidal.
 Jax Jones – composer, lyricist, producer, drum programmer, programmer, recording arranger, synthesizer programmer
 Demi Lovato – composer, lyricist, vocalist
 Stefflon Don – composer, lyricist, vocalist
 MNEK – composer, lyricist
 Mark Ralph – producer, mixer
 Stuart Hawkes – mastering engineer
 Drew Smith – engineer
 Tom AD Fuller – assistant recording engineer

Charts

Weekly charts

Year-end charts

Certifications

Release history

References

2017 singles
2017 songs
Demi Lovato songs
Jax Jones songs
Stefflon Don songs
Songs written by Jax Jones
Songs written by Demi Lovato
Polydor Records singles
Songs written by MNEK
Songs written by Stefflon Don
Song recordings produced by Mark Ralph (record producer)
Song recordings produced by Jax Jones
Dancehall songs